Moebius: Empire Rising is a graphic adventure video game developed by Pinkerton Road Studio and published by Phoenix Online Publishing for Microsoft Windows, OS X and Linux.

Synopsis

According to the description on its Kickstarter page, the game tells the story of Malachi Rector, an antiques dealer who travels the world hunting down valuable artifacts. After returning from a trip to Spain he's hired by Amble Dexter, the head of a secretive government agency called FITA, "to investigate a series of events and document them in his meticulous way".

Development 
On April 10, 2012, Pinkerton Road Studio announced their plans to have a crowd funded production of two new graphic-adventure games titled Moebius and Mystery Game X, inspired by recent Kickstarter successes such as Double Fine's recent success of using Kickstarter to fund Double Fine Adventure.

On May 7, 2012, Pinkerton Road Studio reached its Kickstarter goal of $300,000. Jane Jensen's Kickstarter campaign ended on May 19, accumulating over $435,000 from backers.

Reception 

Moebius: Empire Rising received mixed reviews from critics. It received an average score of 60.00% on GameRankings and a weighted score of 54/100 on Metacritic.

References

External links 
 

2014 video games
Crowdfunded video games
Kickstarter-funded video games
Linux games
MacOS games
Point-and-click adventure games
Single-player video games
Video games developed in the United States
Video games set in Egypt
Video games set in New York City
Video games set in Paris
Video games set in Qatar
Video games set in Switzerland
Video games set in Venice
Video games set in Washington, D.C.
Windows games